Tumby Bay Airport  is located at Tumby Bay, South Australia.

See also
 List of airports in South Australia

References

Airports in South Australia
Eyre Peninsula